Blankenhagen is a municipality in the Rostock district, in Mecklenburg-Vorpommern, Germany.

References